Jerzy Kruszczyński (born 27 June 1958) is a former Polish footballer. He is often known by the pseudonym Kruchy.

Football

Early years
Growing up in Szczecin, Kruszczyński started playing for his local professional teams, Pogoń Szczecin and Arkonia Szczecin. He joined the Pogoń youth teams at the age of 12, before signing his first professional contract with Pogoń in 1976 aged 18. After 2 seasons with Pogoń, Kruchy moved to rivals Arkonia. He stayed with Arkonia for 5 seasons until 1983.

Lechia Gdańsk
Kruchy joined Lechia in 1983, just after the team had won the Polish Cup and secured promotion to II liga, the second tier in Polish football. His first competitive match for Lechia was to be the Polish SuperCup final against Lech Poznań. Lechia ended up winning the final due to Kruchy's 88th-minute goal to secure victory with a 1-0 win. In his first season with Lechia it was also Lechia's first ever season taking part in a continental competition, despite being in the second tier. Lechia were drawn with Italian and European giants, Juventus. Lechia lost 10-2 over both legs, with the home leg finishing 3-2 to Juventus, but with Kruchy scoring the second Lechia goal in the game, a penalty in the 63rd minute to put Lechia 2-1 ahead. The season was successful for both Lechia and Kruszczyński. Lechia won the II liga, securing promotion to the Ekstraklasa for the first time in 22 years, while Kruchy ended up being the league's top goal-scorer scoring 31 goals in 30 games, including hat-tricks in both games against arch rivals Arka Gdynia.

The following season Lechia were back in the top flight. While the season was not as spectacular in terms of goals scored or competitions they competed in, Lechia succeed in avoiding relegation, with Kruchy scoring an important 8 goals in 27 appearances.

Lech Poznań
Kruchy moved to Lech for the 1985-86 season. While at Lech, he didn't make the same goal scoring impact he initially had at Lechia, scoring 6 goals in his first season. In total he amassed 108 goals while scoring 30 goals for Lech. The Lech team was much more competitive than the previous Lechia team, and offered him the chance to win more silverware. Lech won the Polish Cup in the 1987-88 season, and finished runners up in the Polish SuperCup the following season. Lech were also often much more competitive than Lechia in the league, but failed to win the title while Kruchy was at the club. While at Lech, Kruchy competed in European competitions every season, two of these seasons however being the UEFA Intertoto Cup. Most famously was in his final season for Lech when they beat Albanian team Flamurtari Vlorë in the first round, securing a second-round game against the Spanish giants Barcelona. Both legs finished 1-1, with Kruchy once again scoring from the penalty spot in the home leg. After finishing as a draw after extra-time, Barcelona went through after winning 5-4 on penalties.

Return to Lechia
After 4 seasons with Lech, Kruchy had a brief spell in Sweden with Umeå FC before returning to Lechia Gdańsk again. The stay at Lechia was only for half a season, with Kruchy scoring 3 goals in 9 games for Lechia, before finally retiring from football.

Sweden
After returning from playing professional football, Kruchy moved to Sweden where he managed two female football teams, Umeå Södra FF, the female section of Umeå FC where he briefly played, and Gislaveds FF. In total he spent 10 years working in Sweden before returning to Poland.

Personal life

Kruszczyński is commemorated by a star at the MOSiR Stadium in Gdańsk. The "Avenue of Stars" commemorates the efforts and success of former players and coaches.

Honours

Club

Lechia Gdańsk
II liga (western group)
Winner (1): 1983-84
Polish SuperCup
Winner (1): 1983

Lech Poznań
Polish Cup
Winner (1): 1987-88
Polish SuperCup
Runners-up (1): 1988

Individual

Top goal-scorer
II liga (western group)
1983-84: 31 goals

References

1958 births
Living people
Lechia Gdańsk players
Lech Poznań players
Pogoń Szczecin players
Polish footballers
Association football forwards